Noel Rock (born 11 November 1987) is a former Irish Fine Gael politician who served as a Teachta Dála (TD) for the Dublin North-West constituency from 2016 to 2020. He previously served as Chair of the Committee on Housing, Planning and Local Government from 2019 to 2020.

Early life and career
Rock was born in Dublin and grew up in the Ballymun and Glasnevin areas, where he was raised by his mother and grandparents. He was educated at Our Lady of Victories National Boys' School, Ballymun and St. Aidan's CBS in Whitehall. He attended Dublin City University, where he was the chair of the university's branch of Young Fine Gael. He remains an active member of Young Fine Gael.

While studying at DCU, Rock interned with then US Senator Hillary Clinton as a legislative intern focusing on foreign policy. He later interned in Iowa with her 2008 Presidential campaign ahead of the Iowa Caucuses. He welcomed Clinton to DCU for a speech in 2012. He has also worked as an assistant manager for the Washington Ireland Program and as a press assistant with the European Parliament. Following his time in DCU he worked in communications for a startup cloud computing company.

Rock first ran for a seat on the Dublin City Council in 2009, and was the last candidate deemed to not be elected in his LEA. In 2011, he was a campaign organiser for John Paul Phelan, which successfully sought to elect Phelan to Dáil Éireann for Carlow–Kilkenny, where he topped the poll. Rock has also worked as a secretarial assistant for Catherine Noone, a former Senator on the Industrial and Commercial Panel.

Dublin City Council
After unsuccessfully contesting the Ballymun LEA at the 2009 local election, Rock once more ran for the seat at the 2014 local elections. Despite a poor showing by Fine Gael nationwide, Rock won election to Dublin City Council and took the third seat in a seven-seat constituency. During the 2014 local elections, Rock made a "No Expense Pledge" where he would not take the €36,000 allowance given to councillors. This was fulfilled and, for his time as a Councillor, he took €0 in expenses.

Dáil Éireann
Rock was elected to the Dáil at the 2016 general election. He represented the Dublin North-West constituency. While serving as a TD, Rock emphasized local projects to improve transportation, including the expansion of the LUAS to Finglas, adding bus routes and introducing Dublin’s first 24-hour bus service. Rock proposed a bill to end ticket touting in 2019. In 2016, Rock encouraged the Irish government to increase the minimum wage by more than the 10-cent raise recommended by the non-partisan Low Pay Commission. The minimum wage was increased by 30 cent the next year.

In September 2019, Taoiseach Leo Varadkar appointed Noel Rock to become Chairman of the Oireachtas Housing Committee in place of Maria Bailey, which was seen as significant, as he was the first Fine Gael TD to condemn Bailey at the time. He chaired the Committee until the 2020 general election and oversaw the passage of several important pieces of legislation such as the Housing (Regulation of Approved Housing Bodies) Bill 2019 as well as authoring the Committee's report into the General Scheme of the Land Development Agency Bill 2019.

Following a redrawing of Dublin North-West, Rock lost his seat at the general election in February 2020. He was an unsuccessful candidate at the 2020 Seanad election.

References

External links

1987 births
Living people
People educated at St Aidan's C.B.S.
Alumni of Dublin City University
Fine Gael TDs
Local councillors in Dublin (city)
Members of the 32nd Dáil
People from Glasnevin